Sphagnum subsecundum, the slender cow-horn bog-moss, is a species of moss in the family Sphagnaceae. It is the namesake of a species complex. The complex has a nearly worldwide distribution in wetlands, with the species proper found in Europe, eastern North America  and North Africa (in the Tunisian peatlands of Dar Fatma).

References

subsecundum
Plants described in 1819